Martin Hyatt is an American contemporary writer. Born in Louisiana, he later attended Goddard College, Eugene Lang College, and received an MFA in creative writing from The New School. Hyatt's fiction is usually set in the working-class American South. His work is characterized by its lyricism and realism.  He has taught writing at a number of colleges and universities, including Hofstra University and Parsons School of Design.  He has taught Creative Writing at School of Visual Arts, St. Francis College, and Southern New Hampshire University.

Works

Books

A Scarecrow's Bible (novel) 
His critically acclaimed first novel, A Scarecrow's Bible, was published in 2006.  The novel, set in the deep south, centers on a closeted, working-class, married Vietnam veteran who comes to terms with his sexuality while battling a drug addiction.  For this book, Hyatt won the Edmund White Award for debut fiction in 2007.  The American Library Association named his novel a Stonewall Honor Book.  He was also a finalist for the Ferro-Grumley Award, the Lambda Literary Award, and the Violet Quill Award.  Critic Richard Labonté named A Scarecrow's Bible one of the top ten fiction titles of the year.  In 2007, he was named a literary "Star of Tomorrow" by New York Magazine. Edmund White called the book "a stunning début.".   Poet/activist Minnie-Bruce Pratt said the book was a "narrative tour-de-force."

Beautiful Gravity (novel) 
On May 22, 2015, Publishers Marketplace announced that Hyatt's new book, Beautiful Gravity is to be published by AntiBookClub in Spring, 2016. Beautiful Gravity is "set in a small town deep in the Louisiana bayous when the peaceful nothingness that envelops the narrator and his only friend, the anorexic daughter of the Pentecostal preacher, turns emotionally turbulent with the arrival of a beautiful city burnished couple in a red sports car and love affairs of every persuasion change lives forever."   In January, the American Library Association announced that Beautiful Gravity had received a 2017 Stonewall Honor Book Award from the American Library Association.  The book received critical praise in places such as Kirkus and New York Journal of Books.

Greyhound Country (memoir) and other works 
Hyatt's work has appeared in a wide range of publications and anthologies.  His personal essays, "How To Skin A Deer" (University of Wisconsin Press) and "Greyhound Boy, 1976" (Alyson Books) were featured in Lambda Literary award-winning anthologies and on The Huffington Post  Other personal essays, including "In Tongues" (Electric Literature) and "My Last Big Addiction" are excerpts from Hyatt's memoir, Greyhound Country.  The memoir chronicles the author's struggles with addiction, and his relationship with his southern family, including his developmentally disabled younger brother. His 2016 Huffington Post post-election piece "An Open Letter to Mike Pence: We are Not Doing That Again" was widely read and shared on social media.

Essays and stories 
"An Open Letter to Mike Pence" in The Huffington Post.  November, 2016.

"How to Skin a Deer."  In Who's Yer Daddy. Eds. Elledge and Groff:  Wisconsin:  University of Wisconsin Press, 2012.

"My Last Big Addiction." In Love, Christopher Street. Ed. Thomas Keith. New York:  Vantage Point Press, 2012.

"In Tongues." Electric Literature, 2009

"Greyhound Boy, 1976."  Love, Bourbon Street.  Eds. Herren and Willis: New York: Alyson, 2006.

"Grit, My Love."   excerpt, New York Magazine, June 4, 2007.

"A Scarecrow's Bible." excerpt, Lodestar Quarterly.  Issue 18.  (Summer 2006)

"Kissing Montgomery Clift." Blithe House Quarterly, 8.2. (Spring 2004)

"Faded Rooms." Sandbox Magazine, NYC (Spring 1997)

Awards and nominations 
2017 - Recipient, Stonewall Honor Book Award, American Library Association

2017 - Finalist, Lambda Literary Award Nomination, Bisexual Fiction

2007 - Recipient, Edmund White Award for Debut Fiction

2007 - Recipient, Stonewall Honor Book Award, American Library Association

2007 - Finalist, Lambda Literary Award

2007 - Finalist, Ferro-Grumley Award

2006 - Finalist, Violet Quill Award, Doubleday/Insight Out Book Club

2003 - Edward F. Albee Writing Fellowship

2002 - New School Chapbook Award (fiction)

References
2017 Stonewall Book Award Winners Announced

Beautiful Gravity Review NY Journal of Books

Kirkus Review: Beautiful Gravity by Martin Hyatt

 Future Writing Stars New York Magazine

AntiBook Club Authors

Martin Hyatt KQED/NPR San Francisco

Martin Hyatt Interview with Jessie Sholl

Martin Hyatt in Lodestar Quarterly

Martin Hyatt Electric Literature

Stonewall Book Award

Living people
21st-century American novelists
Year of birth missing (living people)
American gay writers
Novelists from Louisiana
Goddard College alumni
The New School alumni
American LGBT novelists
American male novelists
Hofstra University faculty
Parsons School of Design faculty
Southern New Hampshire University faculty
21st-century American male writers
Novelists from New York (state)